China mark moth may refer to:

 Cataclysta lemnata, the small china mark moth, found in Europe
 Elophila nymphaeata, the brown china mark moth, a relatively common European species
 Nymphula nitidulata, the beautiful china mark, found across Eurasia
 Nymphuliella daeckealis, a North American species

Animal common name disambiguation pages